MEGAN ("MEtaGenome ANalyzer") is a computer program that allows optimized analysis of large metagenomic datasets.

Metagenomics is the analysis of the genomic sequences from a usually uncultured environmental sample. A large term goal of most metagenomics is to inventory and measure the extent and the role of microbial biodiversity in the ecosystem due to discoveries that the diversity of microbial organisms and viral agents in the environment is far greater than previously estimated.  Tools that allow the investigation of very large data sets from environmental samples using shotgun sequencing techniques in particular, such as MEGAN, are designed to sample and investigate the unknown biodiversity of environmental samples where more precise techniques with smaller, better known samples, cannot be used.

Fragments of DNA from an metagenomics sample, such as ocean waters or soil, are compared against databases of known DNA sequences using BLAST or another sequence comparison tool to assemble the segments into discrete comparable sequences.  MEGAN is then used to compare the resulting sequences with gene sequences from GenBank in NCBI.  The program was used to investigate the DNA of a mammoth recovered from the Siberian permafrost and Sargasso Sea data set.

Introduction 

Metagenomics is the study of genomic content of samples from same habitat, which is designed to determine the role and the extent of species diversity. Targeted or random sequencing are widely used with comparisons against sequence databases. Recent developments in sequencing technology increased the number of metagenomics samples. MEGAN is an easy to use tool for analysing such metagenomics data. First version of MEGAN was released in 2007    and the most recent version is MEGAN6. First version is capable of analysing taxonomic content of a single dataset while the latest version can analyse multiple datasets including new features (query different databases, new algorithm etc.).

MEGAN Pipeline 

MEGAN analysis starts with collecting reads from any shotgun platform. Then, the reads are compared with sequence databases using BLAST or similar. Third, MEGAN assigns a taxon ID to processed read results based on NCBI taxonomy which creates a MEGAN file that contains required information for statistical and graphical analysis. Lastly, lowest common ancestor (LCA) algorithm can be run to inspect assignments, to analyze data and to create summaries of data based on different NCBI taxonomy levels. LCA algorithm simply finds the lowest common ancestor of different species.

References

External links 
 

Metagenomics software
Phylogenetics software
Molecular biology